The 2017–18 Florida Atlantic Owls men's basketball team represented Florida Atlantic University during the 2017–18 NCAA Division I men's basketball season. The Owls, led by fourth-year head coach Michael Curry, played their home games at the FAU Arena in Boca Raton, Florida as members of Conference USA. They finished the season 12–19, 6–12 in C-USA play to finish in a tie for 11th place. They lost in the first round of the C-USA tournament to UAB.

March 16, 2018, head coach Michael Curry was fired after four seasons at Florida Atlantic. On March 22, it was announced that the school had hired Florida assistant head coach Dusty May as head coach.

Previous season 
The Owls finished the 2016–17 season 10–20, 6–12 in C-USA play to finish in a tie for 11th place. They lost in the first round of the C-USA tournament to Marshall.

Offseason

Departures

Incoming transfers

2017 recruiting class

Roster

Schedule and results

|-
!colspan=9 style=| Exhibition

|-
!colspan=9 style=| Non-conference regular season

|-
!colspan=12 style=| Conference USA regular season

|-
!colspan=9 style=| Conference USA tournament

Source

References

Florida Atlantic Owls men's basketball seasons
Florida Atlantic
Florida Atlantic Owls men's b
Florida Atlantic Owls men's b